Steve Rolston (born 8 February 1978) is a Canadian artist and writer of comic books and graphic novels currently living in Vancouver, British Columbia. After working in story boards for various animated series, he got his first break from Oni Press as the penciler and inker of the first four issues of their on-going Queen & Country comic series by praised author Greg Rucka. From 2005 to 2017, Rolston taught a course at Vancouver Institute of Media Arts entitled "Introduction to Comic Book Production".

Biography
Born in Vancouver, British Columbia, Rolston was raised in Pender Harbour on the Sunshine Coast.

Bibliography
Comics

Assorted Meats (1996, Biohazard Publishing)
Jack Spade and Tony Two-Fist (2000, Cartoon Militia)
Queen & Country #1-4, 25 (with Greg Rucka, 2001, Oni Press)
Gumbo #2 (2001, Syndicate Publishing)
Jingle Belle Jubilee one-shot (with Paul Dini, 2001, Oni Press)
9-11: Artists Respond (2002, Dark Horse Comics)
Oni Press Color Special (with Sabina, 2002, Oni Press)
Pounded (with Brian Wood, 2002, Oni Press)
Mek (with Warren Ellis, 2003, WildStorm)
One Bad Day (2003, Oni Press)
Sidekicks Super Fun Summer Special (with J. Torres, 2003, Oni Press)
Lost Souls in Love (2004)
Four Letter Worlds (with Jay Faerber, 2005, Image Comics)
The Escapists (with Brian K Vaughan, 2006, Dark Horse Comics)
Tales of the TMNT #28 (with Stephen Murphy, 2006, Mirage)
Little Ghost (2006)
Degrassi: Extra Credit vol. 4 (with J Torres, 2007, Fenn / Simon & Schuster)
House of Mystery #4 (with Matthew Sturges, 2008, Vertigo)
Emiko Superstar (with Mariko Tamaki, 2008, Minx)
You Ain't No Dancer #3 (with Sabina, 2008, New Reliable Press)
Seeing Red (with Cora Lee, 2009, Annick Press)
Ghost Projekt (with Joe Harris, 2010, Oni Press)
Great Motion Mission (with Tanya Lloyd Kyi, 2012, Annick Press)
The Graphic Canon Volume 3 (with Ernest Hemingway, 2013, Seven Stories Press)
Public Relations #6-11 (with Matthew Sturges & Dave Justus, 2016, Devil's Due/1First Comics)
Everafter #6 (with Dave Justus, Lilah Sturges & Ande Parks, 2017, Vertigo)
Japanese Vending Machines (2018, Gumroad)

Filmography
Television

Awards and nominations 
2002 - Eisner Award: Best New Series (for Queen & Country, with Greg Rucka)
2002 - Eisner Award (nomination): Best Continuing Series (for Queen & Country, with Greg Rucka)
2002 - Eisner Award (nomination): Best Serialized Story (for Queen & Country #1-4: Operation: Broken Ground, with Greg Rucka)
2002 - Russ Manning Most Promising Newcomer Award (nomination)
2008 - Cybils Award: Best Young Adult Graphic Novel (for Emiko Superstar, with Mariko Tamaki)
2009 - Joe Shuster Award (nomination): Comics for Kids (for Emiko Superstar, with Mariko Tamaki)
2009 - Joe Shuster Award (nomination): Outstanding Comic Book Artist
2010 - Science in Society Book Award (honorable mention): Youth Book under 16 Years 
2020 - Daytime Emmy Awards: Best Outstanding Special Class Animated Program (for The Last Kids on Earth)
2020 - Leo Awards: Best Animated Program (for The Last Kids on Earth)

References

External links
 
 
 

1978 births
Living people
Artists from Vancouver
Canadian comics artists
Canadian comics writers
Writers from Vancouver